Anthoxanthum gracile is an ornamental plant.

References
 

Pooideae
Flora of Malta